Planoprotostelium aurantium is a mycetozoan species.

References

Mycetozoa
Species described in 1971